The St. Lawrence Cathedral Also Duitama Cathedral Is a religious temple of the Catholic Church under the invocation of St. Lawrence (San Lorenzo), is located in the central zone of the city of Duitama in the South American country of Colombia and belongs to the great group of temples that are in the center of the city; In the case of the cathedral, in front of the Park of the Liberators. The cathedral belongs to the Duitama-Sogamoso Diocese.

The temple in carved limestone is composed of two aisles and a central one. It has a cross shape, has two chapels, one corresponds to the baptistery and the other is dedicated to the adoration of the Blessed Sacrament. There are five altars:

The St. Lawrence patron of the Cathedral
The Child God the patron of Duitama
The High Altar
the Blessed Sacrament Chapel Altar
the Solio Altar

See also
Roman Catholicism in Colombia
St. Lawrence

References

Roman Catholic cathedrals in Colombia
Roman Catholic churches completed in 1953
20th-century Roman Catholic church buildings in Colombia